Bambouk (sometimes Bambuk or Bambuhu) is a traditional name for the territory in eastern Senegal and western Mali, encompassing the Bambouk Mountains on its eastern edge, the valley of the Faleme River and the hilly country to the east of the river valley.  It was a formally described district in French Sudan, but in 1895, the border between Sudan and Senegal was moved to the Faleme River, placing the western portion of the district within Senegal.  The term is still used to designate the region, but there is no formal administrative area with that name. 

Bambouk is primarily home to the Malinké people, and a distinctive dialect of the Maninkakan language is spoken there.

History 
According to Martin Meredith, the Carthaginians used Berber nomads to establish a packhorse trade route across the Sahara between Lixus and "the goldfields of Bambuk in the Senegal River valley."

The Diakhanke established Diakha-ba and became Muslim clerics for the Malinke chiefs after Bambuk was conquered by the Mali Empire in the 13th century.  According to Levtzion, "From their centre in Bambuk, the Diakhanke spread to Bondu, Kedougou, and Futa Djallon and established new communities such as Niokhol and Dantilia - in order to secure a monopoly over the trade with the Europeans."

Arab geographers referred to Bambouk, Bouré, Lobi and Ashante gold fields as Wangara.  The Portuguese reached Bambouk in 1550, but were killed off, either by each other or by the locals.  The French built Fort Saint Pierre on the Falémé in 1714, and two trading posts in Bambouk in 1724.  The trading posts were abandoned in 1732 and the fort in 1759.  Another French post was established in 1824, but abandoned in 1841.  Today, Bambouk lies with the Kéniéba Cercle.

According to Levtzion there were, "...three principal goldfields, besides others of lesser importance: Bambuk, between the Senegal and the Faleme rivers; Bure on the Upper Niger; and the Akan goldfields near the forest of the present republics of Ghana and the Ivory Coast."  He further states it may have been the "island of gold or Wangara...where alluvial gold was collected."  "Wasteful methods reduced the productivity of the goldfields...in the eleventh or twelfth century, the Sudanese traders ventured southwards and opened up the new goldfields of Bure on the Upper Niger, in the region of Siguiri."

The area was renowned as a major centre for gold mining from the 12th until the 19th century, and some gold mining still takes place on the Malian side of the border.  It served as the home of the Khasso kingdom in the 18th and 19th centuries before becoming a part of French Sudan.

See also
Kenieba
Kenieba inlier
Birimian

References

Geography of Mali
Geography of Senegal
 Regions of Africa